Anterior urethral cancer is a disease in which malignant cancer cells are found in the part of the urethra that is closest to the outside of the body.

References

Urological neoplasia
Urethra